BAT or B.A.T. may refer to:

Computing
 BAT keyboard, a one-handed chording keyboard
 BAT, Block Address Translation registers in PowerPC microprocessors
 .bat, the filename extension used in DOS and Windows batch files

Medicine
 Blunt abdominal trauma
 Brown adipose tissue
 biogenic amine transporter

Transportation
 Alfa Romeo BAT, concept cars
 BAT Community Connector, a bus system in Bangor, Maine, US
 Battle railway station, Kent, England (National Rail station code)
 British Aerial Transport, a former aircraft manufacturer
 Brockton Area Transit Authority, an agency in Massachusetts, US
 BaT Tunnel, a cancelled project in Brisbane, Australia

Other uses
 120 mm BAT recoilless rifle, a British anti-tank weapon
 Bachelor of Applied Technology, a Canadian degree
 Baseball Assistance Team
 Basic Attention Token, a cryptocurrency
 B.A.T. (G.I. Joe), or Battle Android Troopers, fictional robots in the G.I. Joe universe
 Best available technology, a pollutant regulation term
 Big Ass Truck, a US psychedelic funk band
 Brilliant Anti-Tank, a guided weapon employed by artillery rockets and bombs
 British American Tobacco, London, England
 British Antarctic Territory, claimed by the UK
 B.A.T. (video game) or Bureau of Astral Troubleshooters, a 1990 computer game
 Burst Alert Telescope, an X-ray telescope used on the Swift Gamma-Ray Burst Mission
 Baltic languages' ISO 639-2 and ISO 639-5 codes

See also
 Bat (disambiguation)
 Bats (disambiguation)
 BATX, an acronym used to describe the Mainland Chinese tech giants of Baidu, Alibaba, Tencent, and Xiaomi